Amir Vaziri (born February 5, 1978) is an Iranian footballer who plays for Esteghlal Ahvaz as a striker.

Club career
Having played for Zob Ahan FC in the Iranian Premier League for three years, in 2004 he moved to Tehrani club Paykan F.C., where he stayed only for season 2004/05. In 2005, he moved to another car industry sponsored club, Saipa F.C. In season 2005/06 he made 29 appearances for his club, scoring 7 goals.

References
Iran Premier League Stats

1978 births
Living people
Iranian footballers
Fajr Sepasi players
Zob Ahan Esfahan F.C. players
Paykan F.C. players
Saipa F.C. players
Esteghlal Ahvaz players
Association football forwards
Azadegan League players